Dar Eshkaft (also known as Dareshkāf, Darreh Eshgoft, Dar Shekāf, Toroshakī, and Turushkaf) is a village in Arabkhaneh Rural District, Shusef District, Nehbandan County, South Khorasan Province, Iran. At the 2006 census, its population was 109, in 28 families.

References 

Populated places in Nehbandan County